Otto Wilhelm Masing ( in Lohusuu, Kreis Dorpat, Livland Governorate –  in Äksi, Livland Governorate) was an early Baltic German Estophile and a major advocate of peasant rights, especially regarding education.

Life
He received schooling at the town school of Narva (1777–1779) and then (1779–1782) at the Gymnasium of Torgau (Germany) before studying theology, music and drawing at the University of Halle, returning to Estonia in 1786.

In 1796 he married Dorothea Amalie Ehlertz (1776–1809) in St. John's Church of Dorpat (Tartu), a daughter of the city councillor Carl Ulrich Ehlertz  (1739–1790)  and his wife Louisa Dorothea née Stockenberg (1755–1803), a great-granddaughter of the sculptor Johann Gustav Stockenberg.

Work

His first employment after concluding his studies was as private tutor at the Manor in Neu-Isenhof (Püssi) for the children of the nobleman Otto Magnus von Toll.

In 1788 he became the pastor of the (Lutheran) church in Lüg (Lüganuse) (1788–1795), then serving from 1795 in Maholm (Viru-Nigula) (1795–1815) and from 1815 in Ecks (Äksi), where he remained as pastor until his death.

From 1818 he also took on the post of assessor of the consistory of Livonia and from 1821 onwards he was also Provost for Tartu.

Contributions as publicist and linguist

In 1795, Masing compiled and published a children's textbook for learning reading, the ABD. (The letter 'C' does not appear in Estonian words, and back then, was not considered a member of Estonian alphabet.  This considered, the title could be translated as "ABC.") He published a further textbook with methodical reading instructions, the Luggemislehhed, in 1821.

From 1821 to 1823, Masing published a newsletter Marahva Näddala-Leht (Estonian for Peasant's Weekly), one of the earliest regular publications in the Estonian language.

Among other linguistic contributions, Masing is credited with creating the letter 'õ' to denote an Estonian phoneme not found in other related languages.

Honours
 Imperial Russian Order of Saint Vladimir, 4th class (awarded 1821)

External links
 Estonica: 1710–1850. The Baltic Landesstaat. Emergence of national consciousness and Estophilia

References

Linguists from Estonia
Estonian Lutheran clergy
Estophiles
Recipients of the Order of St. Vladimir, 4th class
1763 births
1832 deaths
18th-century Estonian people
19th-century Estonian people
Baltic-German people
Burials at Raadi cemetery